Samuel Rappaport (August 25, 1932 – February 8, 2016) was a  Democratic member of the Pennsylvania House of Representatives. He served in the Pennsylvania House from 1971 to 1984.

References

Democratic Party members of the Pennsylvania House of Representatives
1932 births
2016 deaths